Events from the year 1622 in France.

Incumbents 
Monarch: Louis XIII

Events
 April 16 – Huguenot rebellions: Blockade of La Rochelle ends in royal victory.
 May – Huguenot rebellions: siege of Royan – The Huguenot city of Royan is taken by royal forces after a 6-day siege.
 June 11 – Huguenot rebellions: siege of Nègrepelisse – The Huguenot city of Nègrepelisse is taken by royal forces after a short siege by royal forces; the entire population is subsequently massacred and the city burned to the ground.
 July 22 – Huguenot rebellions: siege of Montpellier begins.
 October 18 – Treaty of Montpellier signed, ending the siege of Montpellier and the first of the Huguenot rebellions.
 October 27 – Huguenot rebellions: The inconclusive Naval battle of Saint-Martin-de-Ré is fought between the Huguenot fleet of La Rochelle, commanded by Jean Guiton, and a royal fleet under the command of Charles, Duke of Guise.
 Compagnie Ordinaire de la Mer established by Cardinal Richelieu.
 Musketeers of the Guard established.
 "Rosicrucianism furor" breaks out in Paris.

Births
 January 15 (bapt.) – Molière, born Jean-Baptiste Poquelin, playwright (died 1673)
 January 28 – Adrien Auzout, astronomer (died 1691)
 February 18 – Thomas Regnaudin, sculptor (died 1706)
 May 9 – Jean Pecquet, anatomist (died 1674)
 May 22 – Louis de Buade de Frontenac, Governor of New France (died 1698)
 June 6 – Claude-Jean Allouez, Jesuit missionary and explorer of North America (died 1689)
 September 22 – Jacques Savary, merchant and economist (died 1690)

Deaths
 January 9 – Alix Le Clerc, canoness regular, foundress and blessed (born 1576)
 April 14 – Antoine de Gaudier, Jesuit theologian (born 1572)
 September 7 – Denis Godefroy, lawyer (born 1549)
 September 14 – Alof de Wignacourt, 54th Grandmaster of the Knights Hospitaller (born 1547)
 November 17 – Pierre Biard, settler, Jesuit missionary (born 1567)
 December 28 – Francis de Sales, Catholic Bishop of Geneva (born 1567 in the Duchy of Savoy)
 Dominique Barrière, painter and engraver (died 1678)

See also

References

1620s in France